Rabbit Island may refer to:

Places

Australia

New South Wales 
 Rabbit Island (New South Wales), also known as Peat Island
 Rabbit Island, Lord Howe Island group - alternate name for Blackburn Island

Queensland 
 Rabbit Island (Queensland), Newry Islands National Park

South Australia 
 Rabbit Island (South Australia), a small island in Louth Bay
 Rabbit Island (Coffin Bay)
 Rabbit Island (Coorong), near Magrath Flat
 Rabbit Island (Jussieau Peninsula), also known as Owen Island

Tasmania 
 Rabbit Island (Tasmania)

Victoria 
 Rabbit Island, a small island in Mallacoota Inlet
 Rabbit Island, a small island in Swan Bay near Queenscliff
 Rabbit Island (Bass Strait), a small island off Wilsons Promontory
 Rabbit Rock (Bass Strait), a small island off Wilsons Promontory

Western Australia 
 Rabbit Island (Western Australia), a small island near Denmark
 Rabbit Island (Albany), an historical, colloquial name for Mistaken Island
 Rabbit Island (Esperance)

Canada
Rabbit Island (Georgian Bay), Ontario
Rabbit Island (Western British Columbia), near Vancouver, British Columbia
Rabbit Island (British Columbia), in the South Thompson River, Kamloops, British Columbia
Rabbit Island (Kivalliq Region)
Naniruaq formerly Rabbit Island (Qikiqtaaluk Region)
Rabbit Island (Nova Scotia)

In the Caribbean
Rabbit Island, Anguilla
Rabbit Island, Antigua and Barbuda
Rabbit Island (Grenadines), an island of St Vincent and the Grenadine

New Zealand
Moturoa / Rabbit Island, Tasman Region, New Zealand
Rabbit Island (Chatham Islands), New Zealand
Rabbit Island, New Zealand several other islands in New Zealand

Turkey
Rabbit Islands (Çanakkale), a group of small islands near Tenedos (Bozcaada)
Rabbit Island (Gümüşlük), a small island near Gümüşlük

United Kingdom
Rabbit Island, County Fermanagh, a townland in County Fermanagh, Northern Ireland
Rabbit Islands, Scotland

United States
 Nickname of Mānana Island in the U.S. state of Hawaii
Rabbit Island (Alabama), in the U.S. state of Alabama
Rabbit Island (Louisiana), in the U.S. state of Louisiana
Rabbit Island (Michigan), in Lake Superior straight east of the Houghton/Hancock area.  
Rabbit Island (Rhode Island), in the U.S. state of Rhode Island
 Ford Island (Rabbit Island), in the U.S. state of Hawaii

Other places
Rabbit Island, Bermuda
Rabbit Island (Cambodia)
Rabbit Island, Falkland Islands is located north of West Falkland in the Falkland Islands
Rabbit Island, Lebanon
Zayachy (Rabbit) Island, Saint Petersburg, Russia
Ōkunoshima, Japan, often called Usagi Shima, or Rabbit Island

Other
Rabbit Island (band), Australian alt-pop band